Walnut Grove Plantation, the home of Charles and Mary Moore, was built in 1765 on a land grant given by King George III. The property is located in Roebuck in Spartanburg, South Carolina. Charles Moore was a school teacher and used the  plantation as a farm. The Moores had ten children, and some of their descendants still live within the area.

The eldest daughter, Margaret Catharine Moore (best known as Kate Barry), served as a scout for General Daniel Morgan during the Battle of Cowpens.  Kate Moore Barry is credited with planting the grove of black walnut trees.

Today, the main house has been renovated and preserved. Tours are given throughout the Manor as well as the other houses, including a schoolhouse, a wheat house, and several other structures.

A stain on the floor of the upstairs bedroom in the manor was for a long time believed to be the blood of a patriot named John Steadman, who was killed by Tory forces led by "Bloody" Bill Cunningham. The stain and this story were popular with tourists. As 21st-century research determined the stain was not from human blood, tour guides have been prohibited from attributing it to the Steadman murder.

References

External links
 Walnut Grove Plantation, Spartanburg County Historical Association, official site
 Walnut Grove Plantation

Historic American Buildings Survey in South Carolina
Houses on the National Register of Historic Places in South Carolina
Georgian architecture in South Carolina
Houses completed in 1765
Historic house museums in South Carolina
Plantation houses in South Carolina
Museums in Spartanburg County, South Carolina
National Register of Historic Places in Spartanburg County, South Carolina
Houses in Spartanburg County, South Carolina